Ernest Hinkson (24 August 1870 – 10 June 1936) was a Barbadian cricketer. He played in two first-class matches for the Barbados cricket team in 1887/88.

See also
 List of Barbadian representative cricketers

References

External links
 

1870 births
1936 deaths
Barbadian cricketers
Barbados cricketers
People from Saint Michael, Barbados